Carl-Henrik Sirevaag Refvik (born 2 January 1995) is a Norwegian football striker who currently plays for Vidar.

He made his league debut as a substitute against Rosenborg in August 2014.

References

1995 births
Living people
Sportspeople from Stavanger
Norwegian footballers
Viking FK players
Eliteserien players

Association football forwards